Lefkeli Mustafa Pasha (died 1648) was an Ottoman statesman. He was Grand Vizier of the Ottoman Empire in 1622 and governor of Egypt in 1618.

See also 
 List of Ottoman Grand Viziers
 List of Ottoman governors of Egypt

References 

1648 deaths
17th-century Grand Viziers of the Ottoman Empire
17th-century Ottoman governors of Egypt
Ottoman governors of Egypt
Year of birth unknown